Molly Burch (born October 23, 1990) is an American singer-songwriter. Based in Austin, Texas, her music often reflects themes of heartbreak and loss. She is the lead vocalist and writer. Burch studied jazz vocal performance at UNC Asheville and gravitated towards vocalists such as Nina Simone and Billie Holiday. A reviewer described her music as an "intoxicating ode to an unrequited love" as from a "smoky club chanteuse". 
She recorded the albums Please Be Mine (Captured Tracks, 2017), First Flower (Captured Tracks, 2018), and The Molly Burch Christmas Album (Captured Tracks, 2019).

Discography

Albums
 Please Be Mine (Captured Tracks, 2017)
 First Flower (Captured Tracks, 2018)
 The Molly Burch Christmas Album (Captured Tracks, 2019)
 Romantic Images (2021)

Singles
 Downhearted ("Downhearted"/"I Adore You") (Captured Tracks, 2016)
 Ballads ("Only One"/"Your Party") (Captured Tracks, 2019)
 needy ("needy") (Captured Tracks, 2020)

References

External links
 Review in Pitchfork
 Downhearted song in YouTube

American women singer-songwriters
People from Austin, Texas
University of North Carolina at Asheville alumni
Living people
1990 births
21st-century American women
Singer-songwriters from Texas